Emerson Fittipaldi (born 12 December 1946) is a Brazilian former automobile racing driver who won both the Formula One World Championship and the Indianapolis 500 twice each and the CART championship once.

Moving up from Formula Two, Fittipaldi made his race debut for Team Lotus as a third driver at the 1970 British Grand Prix. After Jochen Rindt was killed at the 1970 Italian Grand Prix, the Brazilian became Lotus's lead driver in only his fifth Grand Prix. He enjoyed considerable success with Lotus, winning the World Drivers' Championship in 1972 at the age of 25. At the time, he was the youngest ever F1 world champion, and he held the record for 33 years. He later moved to McLaren for 1974, winning the title once again. He surprised the paddock by moving to his brother's Fittipaldi Automotive team prior to the 1976 season, being replaced by James Hunt. Success eluded him during his final years in Formula One, with the Fittipaldi cars not competitive enough to fight for victories. Fittipaldi took two more podium finishes, before retiring in 1980.

Following his Formula One career, Fittipaldi moved to the American CART series, achieving successful results, including the 1989 CART title and two wins at the Indianapolis 500 in 1989 and 1993.

Since his retirement from Indy Car racing in 1996, Fittipaldi races only occasionally. In 2008, he became one of only three people in history to have a Corvette production car named in his honor. At age 67, he entered the 2014 6 Hours of São Paulo.

Early life
Emerson Fittipaldi was born in São Paulo, Brazil. He is the younger son of prominent Italian-Brazilian motorsports journalist and radio commentator Wilson Fittipaldi Sr and his wife Józefa "Juzy" Wojciechowska, an immigrant from Saint Petersburg of Polish and Russian descent.

He was named after American author and philosopher, Ralph Waldo Emerson. Both his parents had raced production cars shortly after the Second World War and Wilson Sr was also responsible for the first Mil Milhas race in 1956, in São Paulo, having been inspired by the 1949 Italian Mille Miglia. Emerson, along with his brother Wilson, became motorsports enthusiasts as young children.

Career history

At age 14, Fittipaldi was racing motorcycles, and at 16, hydroplanes. Wilson was uninjured in the accident, but it prompted both Fittipaldi brothers to stop competing in boat racing and focus solely on racing land vehicles. In 1967, Fittipaldi won the 6 Hours of Interlagos in a Volkswagen Karmann Ghia at the age of 20, and a year later the 12 Hours of Porto Alegre.

The pair moved to racing Formula Vees, and built up a company with their parents. In his second season in single-seaters, Fittipaldi won the Brazilian Formula Vee title at age 21. He left for Europe in 1969, with the ambition to convince team owners of his talent in three months. After some podiums and his first victories in Formula Ford, Fittipaldi was first trained and then subsequently engaged by the Jim Russell Driving School Formula Three team. He won nine F3 races on the Jim Russell Lotus 59 in the MCD Lombard Championship to become the 1969 champion.

Formula Two
For , Fittipaldi moved up to F2 by joining the Lotus semi-works Team Bardahl campaigning Lotus 59B. With six finishes in the points and four on the podium, he ended the eight-race season in third place behind Clay Regazzoni and Derek Bell. While this result was very impressive for the newcomer to the series, the spotlight was on Fittipaldi that year because of his activities in Formula One instead.

Formula One
Based on the success of the Cosworth DFV engine and Lotus 49/49B cars in 1968, Team Lotus was enjoying the reputation as one of the top F1 teams with the inflow of sponsorship money, and Colin Chapman used the third seat on the team for championship races as the testing ground for younger drivers. This was in contrast to the team's tradition to use non-championship F1 events for the purpose.

The third seat was given to Alex Soler-Roig in early 1970, and then to Fittipaldi starting with the British GP in July, with Jochen Rindt and John Miles as the regular seat holders. Fittipaldi scored a fourth place as the No. 3 driver at the next German GP where the No. 1 Jochen Rindt won, and the No. 2 John Miles retired.

Team Lotus plans for the season drastically changed when Jochen Rindt was killed at Monza in September and became the only driver to win the championship posthumously. John Miles also left the team, and Fittipaldi was promoted to be the Lotus No. 1 driver on his fifth F1 race at the United States GP with Reine Wisell and Pete Lovely as the teammates. Fittipaldi proved up to the task and won this first post-Rindt race for Lotus.

In his first full year as Lotus's lead driver in 1971, Fittipaldi finished sixth in the Drivers' Championship as the team further developed the previous season's Lotus 72. Armed with what was arguably the greatest Formula one design of all time, the Lotus 72D, Fittipaldi proved dominant in 1972 as he won five of 11 races and claimed the F1 Drivers' Championship.

At 25 he was then the youngest champion in F1 history. It appeared he might do it again in 1973. But after three wins in four attempts with the 72D, he began to struggle in the new 72E that was unveiled mid-year. It resulted in the reverse of the previous year, with Stewart beating Fittipaldi for the Drivers' Championship.

Fittipaldi left Lotus to sign with the promising McLaren team. Driving the highly efficient McLaren M23, he had three victories in 1974, reached the podium four other times, and beat out Clay Regazzoni in a close battle for his second championship. The following season, he notched two more victories and four other podiums, but was second to a dominant Niki Lauda. However, at the height of his F1 success, Fittipaldi shocked everyone by leaving McLaren to race for older brother Wilson Fittipaldi's Copersucar-sponsored Fittipaldi Automotive team.

He remained with the team for five seasons but only managed a best finish of second. Fittipaldi decided to retire from racing at the end of 1980. He has since said that his last two years in Formula One were very unhappy: "I was too involved in the problems of trying to make the team work, and I neglected my marriage and my personal life", although at the time he cited the deaths of many of his colleagues as his reason. He was only 33, but had been racing in Formula One for a decade. He had failed to finish seven of the last ten races that year and had several times been outpaced by his Finnish teammate Keke Rosberg (a future champion himself). He moved into the management of the team alongside his brother. The team struggled on for another two years with minimal sponsorship, going into receivership at the end of 1982.

CART
After leaving F1 in 1980, Fittipaldi took time out from major racing for four years. In 1984, the 37-year-old Fittipaldi made his debut in the American CART series. He spent his first season acclimatising to IndyCars, driving for two teams before joining Patrick Racing as a replacement for the injured Chip Ganassi. Fittipaldi stayed five years with the team, recording six victories and solid finishes in the overall standings.

In 1989 Fittipaldi had five wins, finished in the top five in every race he completed, and was the CART champion. Among his wins was a dominant performance in the 1989 Indianapolis 500 where he led 158 of 200 laps and won by two laps, but only after a dramatic duel with Al Unser Jr. in the closing laps of the race. Unser ran down Fittipaldi after a late-race restart and passed him for the lead on lap 196. Three laps later, Fittipaldi used lapped traffic to his advantage to pull alongside Unser on the backstretch. Neither driver would give way, and the two cars touched wheels as they went through turn three side by side. Unser's car spun out of control to hit the outside wall, while Fittipaldi was able to maintain sufficient control to keep his car moving straight. In spite of the altercation, Unser applauded Fittipaldi from the infield as Fittipaldi passed by on the final lap.

Roger Penske hired Fittipaldi for his racing team in 1990 and he continued to be among the top drivers in CART, winning at least one race with Penske for six straight years. But for bad luck he might have won three consecutive Indianapolis 500s, suffering blistered tires in 1990 and a gearbox failure in 1991, both while leading. In 1993 he added a second Indianapolis 500 victory by taking the lead from reigning Formula One World Champion Nigel Mansell on lap 185 and holding it for the remainder.

The race saw him break Indianapolis victory lane tradition when he drank a celebratory bottle of orange juice instead of the traditional bottle of milk. He was only the second driver to not drink milk at Indianapolis since the tradition was founded in 1936 (and firmly established in 1956). Fittipaldi owned several orange groves in his native Brazil, and wanted to promote the citrus industry. Fan reaction was negative to the break in tradition despite the fact that Fittipaldi did drink milk shortly after. As a result of drinking the juice, Fittipaldi forfeited $5,000 from the winner's purse and publicly apologized to the American Dairy Association.

Fan reaction to the milk snub was highly negative, and he was booed a week later at Milwaukee, a center of the American dairy industry. In the years that followed, many fans continued to hold the action against him. In interviews since, Fittipaldi explained his action, and apologised for the wave of negativity that followed. Fittipaldi returned to Indianapolis to drive the Chevrolet Corvette Pace Car for the 2008 Indianapolis 500. Despite the passage of 15 years, he was again booed and heckled by some fans during the parade laps.

In May 1994, Fittipaldi skipped a practice session for the Indianapolis 500 after his close friend Ayrton Senna, also a native of Brazil and a former Formula One champion, died in a crash. Fittipaldi was one of the pallbearers during Senna's funeral, alongside Jackie Stewart, Alain Prost and several other F1 world champions. Fittipaldi nearly won his third 500 but clipped the turn 4 wall with 15 laps to go while he was holding a nearly full lap lead over teammate Unser Jr.

Approaching 50, Fittipaldi was still driving in  CART in 1996 when an injury at Michigan International Speedway ended his career. Fittipaldi did not return to the series as a driver after the injury. Fittipaldi finished his CART career with 22 wins. In 2003 he made a return to CART as a team owner.

Later career

Fittipaldi was the acting team principal for the Brazilian A1 GP entry. In 2005 Fittipaldi made a surprise return to competitive racing in the Grand Prix Masters event held at Kyalami in South Africa, finishing second behind fellow F1 driver Nigel Mansell.

In 2008, Emerson and his brother Wilson entered the Brazilian GT3 Championship, driving a Porsche 997 GT3 for the WB Motorsports team. In 2011, he started embracing social media and became a Chairman of Motorsport.com. In 2013 he began writing a regular monthly blog column on the official website of McLaren.

Awards
He was inducted in the Motorsports Hall of Fame of America in 2001.
Fittipaldi was inducted into the Indianapolis Motor Speedway Hall of Fame in 2004.

Racing record

Career summary

Complete Formula One World Championship results
(key) (Races in bold indicate pole position, races in italics indicate fastest lap)

Non-championship Formula One results 

(key) (Races in bold indicate pole position)
(Races in italics indicate fastest lap)

USAC
(key) (Races in bold indicate pole position)

CART
(key) (Races in bold indicate pole position)

Indianapolis 500 results

Complete 24 Hours of Daytona results

Complete Grand Prix Masters results
(key) Races in bold indicate pole position, races in italics indicate fastest lap.

Complete FIA World Endurance Championship results

Personal life

Family

Fittipaldi is the younger brother of former Formula One driver and team owner Wilson Fittipaldi. He is the uncle of TUDOR United Sports Car Championship driver Christian Fittipaldi. He was married to Maria Helena from 1970-82. They had three children. He was married a second time, to Teresa, in the mid-1980s. They have two children.

In early December 2012 he married economist Rossana Fanucchi in São Paulo after a partnership of eleven years. They have a son, Emerson Jr., born in 2007, and daughter Vittoria, born in early 2012. Emerson Jr. competed in the 2021 F4 Danish Championship, finishing third overall.

His daughter Tatiana, married racing driver Max Papis. They have two children, Marco Papis and Matteo Papis; Emerson's grandsons.

His daughter Juliana, had two sons with Carlos da Cruz, Pietro and Enzo Fittipaldi. Pietro and Enzo are also racing drivers, with Enzo being announced as a member of the Red Bull Junior Team in November 2022. Pietro made his Formula 1 debut at the 2020 Sakhir Grand Prix driving for the Haas F1 Team.

Life
In September 1997, while recovering from injuries in a crash at Michigan International Speedway a year earlier, he was flying his private plane across his orange tree farm in the state of São Paulo. The plane lost power and plunged  to the ground, leaving him with serious back injuries. Though Fittipaldi had converted to Christianity the year prior, his beliefs were reinforced after the crash. Fittipaldi is a Protestant in the Presbyterian tradition.

He was a friend of Beatles guitarist George Harrison and was with him shortly before Harrison died in November 2001.

In 2016, Fittipaldi established Fittipaldi Motors, and along with Pininfarina and HWA AG, created his first sports car project, the Fittipaldi EF7.

In August 2022, Fittipaldi announced his candidacy for the Italian Senate, representing the South American overseas constituency, running as a member of the Brothers of Italy political party being eventually defeated by Italo-Argentine Mario Borghese a month later in the 2022 Italian parliamentary elections.

See also

 Ayrton Senna and Nelson Piquet - Formula One world champions from Brazil.
 Mario Andretti, Nigel Mansell and Jacques Villeneuve - Formula One and CART champions.
 Jim Clark, Graham Hill, Mario Andretti, and Jacques Villeneuve - Formula One world champions and Indianapolis 500 winners.
 Jody Scheckter, Michael Schumacher and Jackie Stewart - Formula One world champions whose brothers also drove in the series.

References

Books

External links

The Greatest 33
Emerson embracing social media 

1946 births
Living people
Converts to evangelical Christianity from Roman Catholicism
Brazilian racing drivers
Brazilian Formula One drivers
Formula One team owners
Team Lotus Formula One drivers
McLaren Formula One drivers
Fittipaldi Formula One drivers
Formula One World Drivers' Champions
Formula One race winners
Champ Car champions
Champ Car drivers
Indianapolis 500 drivers
Indianapolis 500 polesitters
Indianapolis 500 winners
Brazilian Champ Car drivers
International Motorsports Hall of Fame inductees
BRDC Gold Star winners
International Race of Champions drivers
European Formula Two Championship drivers
British Formula Three Championship drivers
Brazilian IndyCar Series drivers
Racing drivers from São Paulo
Grand Prix Masters drivers
A1 Grand Prix team owners
Formula Ford drivers
Brazilian Presbyterians
People from Key Biscayne, Florida
Brazilian people of Italian descent
Brazilian people of Russian descent
Brazilian people of Polish descent
World Sportscar Championship drivers
Sportspeople from Miami-Dade County, Florida
FIA World Endurance Championship drivers
Emerson Fittipaldi
Team Penske drivers
BMW M drivers
Hogan Racing drivers
AF Corse drivers
USAC Gold Crown champions